Pomona Township may refer to the following townships in the United States:

 Pomona Township, Jackson County, Illinois
 Pomona Township, Franklin County, Kansas